John Lillywhite (born 10 November 1826 at Hove, Sussex; died 27 October 1874 at St Pancras, London) was an English cricketer and umpire during the game's roundarm era.

John Lillywhite was part of a famous cricketing family, his father being William Lillywhite, a brother being Fred Lillywhite and his cousin being James Lillywhite. In 1863, members of the family established the sports outfitters Lillywhites.

Lillywhite was an all-rounder who batted right-handed and bowled right-arm roundarm, both slow and fast.

His known first-class career spanned the 1848 to 1873 seasons.  He took 223 wickets in 185 matches @ 11.56 with a best analysis of 8/54. He took five wickets in an innings 12 times and 10 wickets in a match twice.  He scored 5127 runs @ 17.43 with a highest score of 138, making two centuries.  He took 94 catches.

He served as cricket coach at Rugby School where he nurtured star all-rounder Tom Wills, one of the founders of Australian rules football.

At the end of the 1859 English cricket season, Lillywhite was one of the 12 players who took part in cricket's first-ever overseas tour when an English team led by George Parr visited North America.

From 1856 to 1873, Lillywhite umpired in 29 first-class matches. On 26 August 1862, during an All-England Eleven v. Surrey match at The Oval, Lillywhite no-balled Edgar Willsher six times in succession for what he deemed to be illegal "high" deliveries. Willsher and the majority of his All-England teammates protested and abandoned the match, and Lillywhite was replaced the following day. The incident provoked much discussion and resulted in the laws of cricket being change to allow overarm bowling from the beginning of the 1864 season.

References

External links 
 CricketArchive
 The New York Clipper
 Lillywhite Family Museum

Further reading
 H S Altham, A History of Cricket, Volume 1 (to 1914), George Allen & Unwin, 1926
 Derek Birley, A Social History of English Cricket, Aurum, 1999
 Rowland Bowen, Cricket: A History of its Growth and Development, Eyre & Spottiswoode, 1970
 Arthur Haygarth, Scores & Biographies, Volumes 3-9 (1841-1866), Lillywhite, 1862-1867
 John Major, More Than A Game, HarperCollins, 2007 – includes the famous 1859 touring team photo taken on board ship at Liverpool

1826 births
1874 deaths
People from Hove
United All-England Eleven cricketers
North v South cricketers
Players cricketers
English cricketers of 1826 to 1863
English cricketers of 1864 to 1889
English cricketers
Sussex cricketers
United South of England Eleven cricketers
Middlesex cricketers
Marylebone Cricket Club cricketers
English cricket umpires
Manchester Cricket Club cricketers
Players of the South cricketers
W. G. Grace's XI cricketers
All-England Eleven cricketers